Bulanki is a rural locality (a village) in Sylvenskoye Rural Settlement, Permsky District, Perm Krai, Russia. The population was 8 as of 2010.

Geography 
Bulanki is located 40 km east of Perm (the district's administrative centre) by road. Troitsa is the nearest rural locality.

References 

Rural localities in Permsky District